Bondart (also Romanized as Bondārt) is a village in Golestan Rural District, in the Central District of Falavarjan County, Isfahan Province, Iran. At the 2006 census, its population was 1,338, in 339 families.

References 

Populated places in Falavarjan County